Charles Edward Pechous (October 5, 1896 in Chicago, Illinois – September 13, 1980 in Kenosha, Wisconsin) was a third baseman in Major League Baseball.

External links

1896 births
1980 deaths
Baseball players from Chicago
Chicago Whales players
Chicago Cubs players
Major League Baseball third basemen
Loyola Ramblers baseball players
Peoria Distillers players
South Bend Benders players
Columbus Senators players
Toledo Mud Hens players
Burials in Wisconsin
Physicians from Wisconsin
Physicians from Illinois
Loyola University Chicago alumni